Decamethylcobaltocene is an organocobalt compound with the formula Co(C5(CH3)5)2, abbreviated CoCp. It is a dark brown solid. This compound is used as a strong reducing agent in organometallic chemistry.

Synthesis 
Decamethylcobaltocene is prepared by treatment of LiCp* with CoCl2:
2 LiCp* + CoCl2   →   2 LiCl  + CoCp*2

The permethylated form is more air-sensitive than the parent cobaltocene, owing to the inductive effects of methyl groups. It is a thermally stable compound and undergoes vacuum sublimation.

Bonding 
Co(C5Me5)2 is a metallocene, having idealized D5d symmetry. Like cobaltocene, decamethylcobaltocene has a 19 electron count in its valence shell and is paramagnetic. 

It is used as a one-electron reducing agent.  Relative to the ferrocene/ferrocenium couple, the redox potential for the [CoCp*2]+/0 couple is -1.94 V compared to the [CoCp2]+/0 couple of -1.33 V (in dichloromethane). For comparison, the difference between the redox ferrocene and its permethylated derivative FeCp*2+/0 couple is -0.59 V (also in dichloromethane).

Structure
Decamethylcobaltocene and decamethylferrocene have very similar structures. The additional electron occupies an orbital that is anti-bonding with respect to the Co-C bonds. Co-C distances of 2.118 Å at room temperature are slightly longer than seen in other metallocenes such as the Fe-C bonds in ferrocene, and fairly longer than its parent cobaltocene at 2.096 Å at room temperature (in the gas-phase, the Co-C distances in Cp2Co is 2.119 Å, closely resembling the Co-C bond lengths of decamethylcobaltocene. 

An illustrative redox reaction of decamethylcobaltocene is:
2 CoCp*2  +  C60 →  2 [CoCp*2]+  +  [C60]2−

References

Organocobalt compounds
Metallocenes
Pentamethylcyclopentadienyl complexes
One-electron reducing agents